The 62nd British Academy Film Awards, given by the British Academy of Film and Television Arts, took place on 8 February 2009 and honoured the best films of 2008.

Winners and nominees

Outstanding British Contribution to Cinema
 Pinewood Studios
 Shepperton Studios

Statistics

In Memoriam

Charlton Heston
John Daly
Patrick McGoohan
Harold Pinter
Jonathan Bates
Claude Berri
Youssef Chahine
Anthony Minghella
Jules Dassin
Richard Widmark
Van Johnson
Michael Crichton
Roy Scheider
Malcolm Cooke
Mel Ferrer
Isaac Hayes
John Michael Hayes
Charles Joffe
Harry Lange
Sydney Pollack
Robert Mulligan
Stan Winston
Mark Shivas
Cyd Charisse
Les Ostinelli
Kon Ichikawa
David Watkin
Paul Newman

See also
 81st Academy Awards
 34th César Awards
 14th Critics' Choice Awards
 61st Directors Guild of America Awards
 22nd European Film Awards
 66th Golden Globe Awards
 29th Golden Raspberry Awards
 23rd Goya Awards
 24th Independent Spirit Awards
 14th Lumières Awards
 20th Producers Guild of America Awards
 13th Satellite Awards
 35th Saturn Awards
 15th Screen Actors Guild Awards
 61st Writers Guild of America Awards

References
 

Film062
2008 film awards
2009 in British cinema
February 2009 events in the United Kingdom
2008 awards in the United Kingdom